The United States Mixed Curling Championship is the annual national curling championship for mixed curling teams in the United States. A mixed curling team consists of two men and two women with the throwing order alternating by gender. The United States Curling Association (USCA) has held the Mixed Championship annually since 1975. Starting in 2015 the winner has gone on to represent the United States at the World Mixed Curling Championship.

The 2019 Mixed Curling Championship was held March 23 to 30 at the Denver Curling Club in Golden, Colorado. Ten teams qualified for the 2019 Championship through regional play-downs.

On July 17, 2020 the USCA announced that the 2020 edition of the Mixed Championship would be cancelled due to the ongoing COVID-19 pandemic.

Past champions 
The winning team for every Mixed Championship since 1975.

Champions by state

References

External links 
 USCA Mixed Nationals website
2019 USA Mixed Nationals on CurlingZone

Curling competitions in the United States
Curling
United States
Recurring sporting events established in 1975